"Mamma Maria" is a song composed by Cristiano Minellono and Dario Farina and performed by the Europop group Ricchi e Poveri. The single was an international hit, which charted in Italy, Germany, Austria, Switzerland, The Netherlands and Belgium.

The song was later covered by several artists, including María Abradelo, James Last, Franz Lambert, Willy Sommers, Little Big (band), Grupa 777 and Luisa Pepe. In 2006 the success of the song revamped in Italy as it was used for a series of Parmigiano-Reggiano commercials.

Charts

Track listing
7" single – BR 50282    
 "Mamma Maria" (Minellono - Farina) -  	 	2:56
 "Malinteso" (Minellono - Farina) -  	3:21

References

 

1982 singles
Italian songs
1982 songs
Ricchi e Poveri songs
Songs written by Dario Farina
Songs written by Cristiano Minellono